Batuhan Çelik (born 12 January 2005) is a Turkish professional footballer who plays as a forward for the Süper Lig İstanbul Başakşehir.

Club career
Çelik is a youth product of Esenler Erokspor, Haliç and İstanbul Başakşehir. He signed his first professional contract with İstanbul Başakşehir on 18 January 2022 for 2.5 seasons. He made his senior and professional debut with them as a late substitute in a 4–1 UEFA Europa League loss to Gent on 15 May 2023.

International career
Çelik is a youth international for Turkey, having played up to the Turkey U18s.

References

External links
 
 

2005 births
Living people
People from Gaziosmanpaşa
Footballers from Istanbul
Turkish footballers
Turkey youth international footballers
Association football forwards
İstanbul Başakşehir F.K. players